Valley Union High School District 22  is a school district in Cochise County, Arizona.

References

External links

School districts in Cochise County, Arizona